The 2016 Southland Conference women's soccer tournament was the postseason women's soccer tournament for the Southland Conference held from November 2 to 6, 2016. The five match tournament was at Jack Dugan Stadium in Corpus Christi, Texas. The six team single-elimination tournament consisted of three rounds based on seeding from regular season conference play. The Southeastern Louisiana Lady Lions were the defending tournament champions after defeating the Sam Houston State Bearkats in a penalty kick shootout in the championship match.

Bracket

Schedule

First round

Semifinals

Final

All-Tournament team

Source:

MVP in bold

References

External links 
2016 Southland Conference Women's Soccer Championship

 
Southland Conference Women's Soccer Tournament